G12 may refer to:

Vehicles 
 EMD G12, an American diesel locomotive
 Fiat G.12, an Italian transport aircraft
 , a Royal Navy G-class submarine
 , a Royal Navy S-class destroyer
 Matchless G12, a British motorcycle
 Prussian G 12, a Prussian steam locomotive
 , a German V1-class torpedo boat

People 
 "G12", a nickname for basketball player Ja Morant

Other uses 
 G12 (postcode), covering most of the West End of Glasgow
 G-12 (Brazilian football), a group of Brazilian football clubs
 G12 Hunchun–Ulanhot Expressway in China
 G12 Vision, a Colombian Christian movement
 Canon PowerShot G12, a digital camera
 County Route G12 (California)
 Group of Twelve, an intergovernmental organization